This is a list of notable people who have attended University of Louisiana at Monroe.

Arts, entertainment, and humanities
Tim Brando — CBS Sports and Fox Sports Net studio radio host
Tim McGraw — country singer, spouse of Faith Hill
Rob Redding – syndicated talk show host
Marc Swayze — comic book artist and writer; former ULM art faculty member

Business
Willie Robertson – owner and CEO of Duck Commander, which appears on the A&E series Duck Dynasty

Government

Executive
William Derwood Cann, Jr. – interim mayor of Monroe from 1978 to 1979 (D); attended Ouachita Parish Junior College in 1937–1938; chairman of ULM Military Department from 1954 to 1956
Robert "Bob" Mann – Chair of Douglas Manship School of Journalism at Louisiana State University
 Melvin Rambin (Class of 1963) – Mayor of Monroe, 2000 to 2001 (R)
 J. Robert Wooley (Class of 1974) – Louisiana insurance commissioner from 2000 to 2006 (D)

Judiciary
Marcus R. Clark — Louisiana Supreme Court Justice (R)
William Wiley Norris, III (1936–2016 – city, district, and circuit court judge from West Monroe (D)
William H. Pryor, Jr. — federal judge (R)
Chet D. Traylor — Associate justice Louisiana Supreme Court, 1997–2009; Republican primary candidate U.S. Senate, 2010 (R)

Legislative
Edwards Barham — first Republican elected to the Louisiana State Senate since Reconstruction; from Oak Ridge (R)
William R. "Billy" Boles, Sr. — former member of Louisiana State Senate (D)
Roy A. Burrell (B. S. Mathematics) – member of the Louisiana House for Caddo and Bossier parishes since 2004 (D)
Donnie Copeland – Pentecostal pastor in North Little Rock, Arkansas, and member of the Arkansas House of Representatives from 2015 to 2017
Ronnie Johns — former pharmacist, state legislator from Sulphur (R)
Speedy Long — member of the Louisiana State Senate from 1956 to 1964, and United States House of Representatives 1965–1973 (D)
Vance McAllister – U.S. Representative, won his seat in Louisiana's 5th congressional district special election, 2013; unseated in 2014 by Ralph Abraham (R)
Jay McCallum (Class of 1982) – former state representative for Lincoln and Union parishes (D); judge since 2003 of the Louisiana 3rd Judicial District court
Fred H. Mills, Jr. (Pharmacy, 1976) – state representative from St. Martin Parish (R)
Jonathan W. Perry (B.A., 1995) – State representative from Vermilion and Cameron parishes (R)
Neil Riser — member of Louisiana State Senate (R)
Jeff R. Thompson – former football player and sports announcer; lawyer, member of the Louisiana House from Bossier City since 2012; incoming judge of the 26th Judicial District Court (R)

Sports

Football
Marty Booker — NFL football player for the Chicago Bears, Miami Dolphins, and Atlanta Falcons
Vincent Brisby — NFL football player for the New England Patriots
Bubby Brister – quarterback, Pittsburgh Steelers, Philadelphia Eagles, New York Jets, Denver Broncos, and Minnesota Vikings
Jimmy Childress – assistant coach of Neville High School from 1958 to 1973 and head coach at Ruston High School from 1979 to 1991; received undergraduate degree at ULM, coached football and baseball at ULM from 1974 to 1976
Pat Dennis — NFL football player for the Kansas City Chiefs
Jimmy Edwards — professional football player
Marcus Green (NFL Wide Receiver for Philadelphia Eagles)
Jackie Harris — NFL football player for the Green Bay Packers
Sam Hughes — quarterback, Miami Hooters
Stan Humphries — quarterback, San Diego Chargers Super Bowl XXIX
Doug Pederson – NFL quarterback for the Miami Dolphins, Green Bay Packers, Philadelphia Eagles, Cleveland Browns, and the Rhein Fire in the World League of American Football; member of the Green Bay Packers Championship team for Super Bowl XXXI; offensive coordinator, Kansas City Chiefs; former offensive QC coach and quarterback coach, Philadelphia Eagles
Lenzy Pipkins — American football player
Roosevelt Potts — NFL football player for the Indianapolis Colts
Don Shows — football coach at ULM (graduate assistant, 1985) and West Monroe High School since 1989, winner of eight Louisiana Class 5A state championships
Pete Thomas — American football player
Larry Whigham — NFL football player for the New England Patriots
Stepfret Williams — NFL football player for the Dallas Cowboys and the Cincinnati Bengals

Basketball
Kristy Curry (née Sims) — head coach of the Texas Tech Lady Raiders basketball team

Baseball
Steve Bourgeois - former MLB pitcher
Wayne Causey – MLB shortstop
Chuck Finley – MLB pitcher California Angels, ex-spouse of Tawny Kitaen
Ben Sheets — 2000 Olympics gold medalist; winning pitcher versus Cuba for gold, MLB pitcher, Atlanta Braves

References

University of Louisiana at Monroe alumni